Paniahue is a Chilean village located north of Santa Cruz, Colchagua Province, O'Higgins Region.

In 1899, it had 1,055 inhabitants, its own post office and a free public school. It currently has 2,526 inhabitants.

History

The village was greatly damaged by the 2010 Chile earthquakes, and the Paniahue apartments became an icon of the earthquake.

See also
 Deportes Paniahue

References

Populated places in Colchagua Province